Merredin railway station is located on the Eastern Goldfields Railway in Western Australia. It is in the town of Merredin.

History
The original Merredin station opened in 1895. It was an important station on the Eastern Goldfields Railway, being the junction station for a number of lines to locations in the Wheatbelt and Goldfields regions.

The main eastern railway connected with Northam to the west, and to Southern Cross to the east.

The narrow gauge lines that connected with Merredin were:
 from the western end of the station, Bruce Rock to the south (for a line to Narrogin)
 from the north of the station area, Nungarin (to Wyalkatchem) to the north
 from the east of the station area, Kondinin to the south (for a line to Narrogin)

When the main eastern railway line was converted to standard gauge in the late 1960s, a new station was built diagonally opposite.

The original station is used as a museum. Exhibits include a G class steam locomotive and TA class diesel locomotive.

In 2021–22, work began on constructing a second high-level platform to improve accessibility.

Marshalling yards 
Due to the wheat silos, and the number of lines running into Merredin, the
area to the west of the railway station was taken up with the marshalling yards.

However the Merredin railway yard had entailed lines adjacent to the railway station.

The importance of the Merredin marshalling yards and railway yard, was reduced as the feeder narrow gauge branch lines were closed over time. Merredin is still the location of a large grain silo complex.

Passenger services

Transwa's MerredinLink and Prospector services stop at Merredin, at least one service each day.

The Indian Pacific also passes here, running once a week each way between East Perth and Sydney Central, but does not stop at the station.

References

External links

Railway stations in Western Australia
Railway stations in Australia opened in 1895
Eastern Goldfields Railway
State Register of Heritage Places in the Shire of Merredin
Merredin, Western Australia